The long-tailed Talaud mosaic-tailed rat or the long-tailed Talaud melomys (Melomys talaudium) is a species of rodent in the family Muridae.
It is endemic to Karakelong and Salebabu in the Talaud Islands in Indonesia where it occurs in forest habitats. It is morphologically similar to the white-bellied mosaic-tailed rat (Melomys leucogaster) and was at one time considered to be a subspecies but is now recognised as a distinct species. The short-tailed mosaic-tailed rat (Melomys caurinus) is also present on the islands and the shorter tail of that species means that it is likely to be mainly terrestrial whereas M. talaudium is largely arboreal.

References

Melomys
Rats of Asia
Endemic fauna of Indonesia
Rodents of Indonesia
Endangered fauna of Asia
Taxa named by Oldfield Thomas
Mammals described in 1921